Patrick Deneen may refer to:

 Patrick Deneen (author) (born 1964), American political theorist and author
 Patrick Deneen (skier) (born 1987), American freestyle skier